Reverend Frederick Ernest Charles Byron, 10th Baron Byron (26 March 1861 – 6 June 1949) was an Anglican clergyman, nobleman, peer, politician, and the tenth Baron Byron, as a grandson of Admiral George Anson Byron, 7th Baron Byron, who was the cousin of Romantic poet and writer George Gordon Byron, 6th Baron Byron.

Life
Byron was the son of the Hon. Frederick Byron and Mary Jane Wescomb. He graduated from Exeter College, Oxford, with the degree of Master of Arts (MA).

He was the Curate between 1888 and 1890 at Royston, Hertfordshire. He was the Rector between 1891 and 1914 at Langford, Essex, UK. He was the Vicar between 1914 and 1942 at Thrumpton, Nottinghamshire. He succeeded to the title of 10th Baron Byron in 1917 upon the death of his older brother Lt. George Frederick William Byron, 9th Baron Byron. He was the Rector between 1941 and 1942 at St. George's Church, Barton in Fabis.

Lord Byron died on 6 June 1949, and was succeeded by his first cousin once removed, Rupert Frederick George Byron, 11th Baron Byron (born 1903).

Family
Lord Byron married Lady Anna Ismay Ethel FitzRoy, daughter of Reverend Lord Charles Edward FitzRoy and the Hon. Ismay Mary Helen Augusta FitzRoy, in 1921. They had no children.

Arms

References
Frederick Byron, 10th Baron Byron, at thepeerage.com (accessed 26 November 2009)

1861 births
1949 deaths
19th-century English Anglican priests
20th-century English Anglican priests
Frederick
Alumni of Exeter College, Oxford
Ordained peers
Barons Byron